John Peter Farnham AO (born 1 July 1949) is a British born Australian singer. Farnham was a teen pop idol from 1967 until 1979, billed then as Johnny Farnham, but has since forged a career as an adult contemporary singer. His career has mostly been as a solo artist, although he replaced Glenn Shorrock as lead singer of Little River Band from 1982 to 1985.

In September 1986, his solo single "You're the Voice" peaked at No. 1 on the Australian singles charts. The associated album, Whispering Jack, held the No. 1 position for a total of 25 weeks and is the second-highest-selling album in Australian history. Both the single and the album had top-ten success internationally, including No. 1 in Sweden.

Farnham has become one of his country's best-known and most popular performers, and he is the only Australian artist to have a number-one record in five consecutive decades (echoing that of Cliff Richard in the UK), with singles: "Sadie (The Cleaning Lady)" in 1967, "Raindrops Keep Fallin' on My Head" in 1970, and "Age of Reason" in 1988; and albums: Whispering Jack in 1986, Age of Reason in 1988 Chain Reaction in 1990, Then Again... in 1993, 33⅓ in 2000, and The Last Time in 2002. Along with touring with numerous artists, including The Seekers and international acts like Stevie Nicks and Lionel Richie, he released collaborative albums including with Tom Jones on Together in Concert (2005) and Olivia Newton-John, including Highlights from The Main Event (1998; also with Anthony Warlow), Two Strong Hearts Live (2015), and Friends for Christmas (2016).

Farnham has been recognised by many honours and awards, including 1987 Australian of the Year, 1996 Officer of the Order of Australia, and 19 ARIA Awards, including his 2003 induction into the Hall of Fame.

From 1969 he was voted by TV Week readers as the 'King of Pop' for five consecutive years.

Aside from his recording career, Farnham performed on stage with lead roles in Australian productions of Charlie Girl, Pippin and 1992's Jesus Christ Superstar. He starred in his own TV series and specials, including It's Magic (With Colleen Hewett), Bobby Dazzler, and Farnham and Byrne (with Debra Byrne), and as a guest on numerous other popular shows such as The Don Lane Show, Countdown and Hey Hey It's Saturday.

Australian rock historian Ian McFarlane described him as "the most successful solo artist in the history of Australian rock and pop ... Farnham has retained an affable sense of humour and a simple, unpretentious 'everyman' charm which also makes him one of the most respected celebrities in Australian entertainment history."

Early life
John Peter Farnham was born in Dagenham, England, on 1 July 1949, to John Peter Farnham Sr., and Rose (née Pemberton) Farnham. His sisters are Jean and Jacqueline, and his younger brother is Steven. Farnham spent his first ten years in the United Kingdom before his family emigrated to Australia in 1959 to live in Melbourne, Victoria. He attended school at Yarraman Park State School (now Yarraman Oaks Primary School), Lyndale Primary School and Lyndale High School.

Musical career

1964–67: The Mavericks to Strings Unlimited
As Johnny Farnham he performed with local band The Mavericks on weekends, while still attending school, from 1964. The band had a five-song repertoire. In late 1965, he was asked to join band Strings Unlimited as lead singer; it was a band composed entirely of string-only instruments, and they had a regular booking at a local hotel.

In 1966, after making the state finals of the Hoadley's Battle of the Sounds, they recorded a three-track demo tape with Farnham on vocals, Stewart Male on lead guitar, Barry Roy on rhythm guitar, Mike Foenander on keyboards, Joe Cincotta on bass and Peter Foggie on drums.

On 29 April 1967, Strings Unlimited performed as a backing band for pop singer Bev Harrell in Cohuna. Harrell's manager and then-boyfriend, Darryl Sambell, was impressed with Farnham's vocals and offered to become his manager. Initially performing in Sambell's home town of Adelaide, Farnham recorded a light advertising jingle "Susan Jones" for flight company Ansett-ANA and was offered a solo record contract working with EMI under house producer David Mackay.

1967–79: Teen pop idol
Farnham's first commercially successful recording was a cover of British novelty song "Sadie (The Cleaning Lady)"; Sambell had disliked it, as the lyrics were so persistent. However, EMI's in-house producer, David MacKay, insisted, and so the single was released in November 1967. The B-side, "In My Room" was written by Farnham. By arrangement with Sambell, Melbourne radio DJ Stan Rofe pretended that he disliked "Sadie" before playing it. The song gave Farnham recognition in Australia. Rofe continued the ploy on TV's Uptight and viewers responded with calls to play the song. It hit No. 1 on the Australian singles charts in January 1968 and remained there for 6 weeks. Selling 180,000 copies in Australia, "Sadie" was the highest-selling single by an Australian artist of the decade and became the biggest-selling single in Australia at that time. Rofe was a writer for Go-Set, a teen-oriented pop magazine, another writer for the magazine, Ian "Molly" Meldrum, praised Farnham's efforts. Go-Set ran a pop poll to determine the 'King of Pop', which was first won by Normie Rowe for 1967–1968. Farnham's 1968 singles were "Underneath the Arches" and "I Don't Want to Love You"; each peaked at #6.

In 1969, Farnham released his album Everybody Oughta Sing a Song, which peaked at No. 12 on the Australian albums charts. His next single was a cover of Harry Nilsson's "One"; Farnham's version peaked at #4. When TV Week sponsored the 'King of Pop' awards, readers would forward their votes from coupons; Farnham won the most popular male award and was crowned 'King of Pop' five consecutive times from 1969 to 1973. He recorded a cover of the B.J. Thomas hit "Raindrops Keep Fallin' on My Head", which became his second No. 1 hit in December 1969 and remained at top spot for seven weeks into January 1970.

Farnham's next album, Looking Through a Tear, was released in July 1970 and peaked at #11. "Comic Conversations", his single from October, peaked at #10. During 1971, Farnham teamed up with Allison Durbin, who had been chosen as 'Most Popular Female Performer' at the 'King of Pop' awards for 1969–71. They released an album, Together, in September and a single, "Baby, Without You". in November, both peaked into the top 30 of their respective charts. As well as his singing career, Farnham performed in stage musicals, starting with Dick Whittington and His Cat in 1971, and on television variety shows either as a guest performer or as a host.

At 22, Farnham was appointed 'King of Moomba' in 1972, with Melbourne paper The Sun describing him as a "likeable English migrant" who is "King of Pop, King of Kids and today Johnny Farnham was King of Moomba." In 1972, Farnham had a top 5 national hit with a cover version of the title track from the David Cassidy international hit album, Rock Me Baby.

Another stage musical for Farnham was Charlie Girl in 1971. Jillian Billman was one of the dancers, and Farnham married her on 18 April 1973. Meldrum announced their wedding plans in Go-Set but Sambell denied the early reports, and, despite being best man at the wedding, was against Billman marrying Farnham. The clean-cut pop star had made several more albums and singles, but by the mid-1970s his recording career had begun to dwindle and he turned more to stage musicals and television. Farnham and 'Queen of Pop' for 1972–1973, Colleen Hewett, combined on the 1973–74 stage musical, Pippin, and its associated show album released in 1974. Also in 1974, Farnham and Hewett were co-hosts of It's Magic, a children's TV series on Channel Ten. He became familiar to viewers of Countdown when hosting its first colour transmission in early 1975 and introducing Skyhooks' performance of "Horror Movie".
Relations with Sambell became strained and in January 1976 they announced their split. Farnham first turned to Kenn Brodziak, producer of Pippin, for his management during 1976–78, and then to Danny Finley, Hewett's then husband, from 1978.

Farnham starred in a situation comedy series Bobby Dazzler as the title character during 1977–78, and narrated documentaries including Survival with Johnny Farnham. Farnham was in financial trouble with unpaid taxes and the collapse of a restaurant venture with Hewett and Finley. Farnham's singing career was now confined to the cabaret circuit and stage musicals. In 1979, he changed his stage name to John Farnham.

1980–85: Little River Band era
Farnham had met Glenn Wheatley, who was bass guitarist of 1960s rock group The Masters Apprentices, when both acts were managed by Sambell. Wheatley was now managing Little River Band (LRB), and Farnham signed with Wheatley in 1980. They decided his comeback single would be a reworking of The Beatles' "Help!", which was produced by LRB's Graeham Goble, it peaked at #8. Farnham was utilising a more adult contemporary pop style and the associated album, Uncovered, also produced by Goble, peaked at #20. The B-side of "Help" was another of Farnham's songwriting efforts "Jillie's Song", co-written with Goble.

In recording the album, Farnham's studio band were guitarist Tommy Emmanuel (ex-Southern Star Band), keyboardist Mal Logan (ex-Renée Geyer Band, LRB), drummer Derek Pellicci (LRB) and bass guitarist Barry Sullivan (ex-Chain). They became his tour band until Logan and Pellicci returned to their LRB commitments and were replaced by Sam McNally and David Jones, respectively. In 1980, Farnham also appeared in a TV series entitled Farnham and Byrne with former Young Talent Time teen star and 'Queen of Pop' Debra Byrne. Three other solo singles followed in 1981, but none of them charted into the top 50.

In February 1982, after Glenn Shorrock had departed Little River Band, Farnham became their lead vocalist after recommendations by Goble and Wheatley. Farnham had initially resisted the idea of joining LRB, but Wheatley convinced him that Shorrock approved of the replacement. This continued Farnham's move away from cabaret and into rock music.

With Farnham, Little River Band recorded three studio albums, which had modest success, but it was not enough to pay back the advances the record company had provided. The first studio album, The Net, was already written, and Farnham had no say in the songs; he just had to record his lead vocals. In the US, charting albums with Farnham's vocals included Greatest Hits (1982), The Net (1983), and Playing to Win (1984) on Billboard Pop Albums chart/Billboard 200. While charting singles were, "The Other Guy", "We Two", "You're Driving Me Out of My Mind" and "Playing to Win". Farnham's biggest Australian hits with LRB were the 1982 single "Down on the Border" which peaked at No. 7 and The Net which peaked at No. 11 on the albums charts in 1983.

During this time, Farnham started supplying vocal tracks for films, including Savage Streets (1984), The Slugger's Wife (1985), and Fletch (1985); he later continued with Rad (1986) and Voyage of the Rock Aliens (1987). "Justice for One" was co-written by Farnham, for Savage Streets and it was released as a solo single.

Little River Band recorded a concert in Melbourne that aired in the United States on HBO. The concert video was only one hour long, and it highlighted some of the songs from The Net as well as reworked versions of Little River Band classics such as "Cool Change" and "Reminiscing". "Please Don't Ask Me", a song written by Goble, and a non-top 50 single for Farnham almost three years previously, was played during the "Australian-themed" opening of the show. Despite positive Australian and US reviews and responses, this performance has not yet been released on VHS or DVD.

In an interview with Channel Seven, Farnham stated: "I'll be better off leaving, rather than putting myself under pressure that I've created." Through this matter, it became apparent to the band that Farnham was intending on leaving and Playing to Win'''s lead single "Playing to Win", a song believed by all to be the band's return to success, then started having authorship disputes. According to Farnham:

As a result, Farnham's relationship with the band was further sullied. To date, the royalties for the song are meticulously divided with different shares to each of the song's contributors, including Goble, Farnham, Stephen Housden, David Hirschfelder and Wayne Nelson. By late 1985, LRB were in conflict again and Farnham left. In mid-1986, Little River Band released the third studio album, No Reins, but Farnham was already pursuing his solo career.

1986–97: Peak solo years
"You're the Voice" and Whispering Jack
Farnham had started collecting a songlist for a future solo album while still in Little River Band. He finished his vocals for their album, No Reins, and left in late 1985.

Farnham's first solo performances since 1981 were live shows with Brett Garsed on lead guitar, Sam See on guitar, Derek Pellicci on drums, Bruno Di Stanislo on electric bass and vocals. Sound engineer Ross Fraser suggested to Farnham's manager Glenn Wheatley that it was time to start working on the solo album. Wheatley searched vainly for a producer and record label willing to work with Farnham; Fraser took on the producer role, and Wheatley provided financial support after mortgaging his house.

While visiting a jazz club in the US, Farnham was mistakenly introduced as Jack Phantom, and when he subsequently provided a running commentary for a local pool game he named himself Whispering Jack Phantom after the Pot Black commentator, "Whispering Ted Lowe". His work for the album, Whispering Jack, included expanding his songlist with Fraser's advice. "A Touch of Paradise" was written by Gulliver Smith and Mondo Rock's Ross Wilson, while "Pressure Down" was provided by Harry Bogdanovs. Two weeks before the album was due to be recorded a demo tape arrived from London with similar material as "Pressure Down", Farnham and Fraser listened to the demo of "You're the Voice" and knew they had found a once-in-a-lifetime song. Another song on offer was "We Built This City" but Farnham knocked it back, so it was later recorded by US band Starship.

Initially, public interest in the re-branded former teen-idol was difficult to cultivate, and radio stations refused to play Farnham's album. Things, however, started to change after Sydney radio station 2Day FM played its first single, "You're the Voice", which was released in September 1986. Henceforth, radio stations began receiving requests for the song. Its television debut was on Hey Hey It's Saturday with Skyhook's Greg Macainsh providing bass guitar. "You're the Voice", peaked at No. 1 in Germany, Sweden and Australia, as well as being a top ten hit in some European countries: #3 in Switzerland, #6 in the UK, and No. 6 in Austria. The song was written by Andy Qunta (ex-Icehouse), Keith Reid (Procol Harum), Maggie Ryder and Chris Thompson (ex-Manfred Mann's Earth Band).Whispering Jack, released in October, became the highest-selling album by an Australian act in Australia, at the time, and peaked at number one on the Australian Album Charts for a total of 25 weeks. As of 2006, it was 24× platinum indicating sales of over 1.68 million units in Australia alone. The album was released internationally on RCA/BMG and peaked at No. 1 in Sweden, No. 3 in Austria, and Top 20 in Norway. In August 1988 it returned to the Australian Top Ten. It also was the first Australian made music CD released in Australia. Other charting Australian singles were December's "Pressure Down", which peaked at No. 4, March 1987's "Touch of Paradise" and October's "Reasons".

After the success of the album, Farnham followed with Jack's Back Tour; an initial itinerary of eleven performances was thought to be enough considering they were up against tours by Michael Jackson and Billy Joel; however, after high ticket sales, it was extended by eight more shows and made use of larger venues. At that time, Jack's Back Tour was the highest-grossing tour by an Australian act. John Farnham Band now consisted of Garsed on lead guitar, David Hirschfelder on keyboards (ex-Little River Band), Macainsh on bass and Angus Burchall on drums.

Farnham also had three tracks featured on the Rad movie soundtrack released in 1986.

Farnham won six of the inaugural 1987 ARIA Music Awards for 'Album of the Year', 'Single of the Year', 'Highest Selling Album', 'Highest Selling Single', 'Best Male Artist' and 'Best Adult Contemporary Album'. On 19 July 1987, TV series Countdown broadcast its last show, the 1986 Countdown Music and Video Awards with Farnham winning the 'Best Album Award' for Whispering Jack.

In 1988, Australia's Bicentennial Year, Farnham was named 1987 Australian of the Year, although he was not yet naturalised—a hastily organised swearing-in occurred before the honour was bestowed. He was chosen due to: "his outstanding contribution to the Australian music industry over 20 years."

Age of Reason and Chain Reaction

Farnham's July 1988 single, "Age of Reason", which peaked at No. 1 on the ARIA singles charts, was written by Johanna Pigott and Dragon member Todd Hunter.

The album, Age of Reason, produced by Ross Fraser, debuted at No. 1 in August and stayed on top for eight weeks. It was the highest-selling album in Australia from 1988, and, as of 1997, it was 11× platinum indicating sales of over 770,000 units.

Renewed interest in Whispering Jack returned it to the Top Ten in August, nearly two years after its initial release. To date, "Age of Reason" remains Farnham's last No. 1 Australian single. Other charting singles from this album were, "Two Strong Hearts" which peaked at No. 6 and "Beyond the Call". Age of Reason had international success peaking at No. 4 in Sweden, and No. 9 in Norway.

At the 1988 ARIA Awards, Farnham won 'Best Male Artist', 'Best Adult Contemporary Album' for "Touch of Paradise", and the 'Outstanding Achievement Award'. In March 1989, Farnham was in Moscow, USSR to promote Greenpeace album Rainbow Warriors, as part of an international ensemble including David Byrne (Talking Heads), Peter Gabriel, Chrissie Hynde (The Pretenders), Annie Lennox (Eurythmics), and The Edge (U2).

Farnham found time to record a duet with Dannielle Gaha, "Communication", which peaked at No. 13 in August 1989. It was recorded as part promotion for the Australian government's program to control the drug epidemic happening in the mid-'80s entitled "The Drug Offensive". The Drug Offensive logo can be seen attached to a television camera in the video clip made to promote the song.Chain Reaction produced by Fraser, was released in October 1990, and also debuted at No. 1 on the Australian album charts, it provided three Top Ten hit singles, "Chain Reaction" in August, "That's Freedom" in September and "Burn for You" in December.

Unlike the previous two albums, where most songs were written by outside writers, Chain Reaction saw Farnham write nine of its twelve tracks with Fraser and keyboardist/musical director David Hirschfelder (ex-Little River Band) along with Phil Buckle (Burn For You) and Joe Crighton (The Time Has Come). The sound was less electronic and more acoustic, it became the biggest-selling album in Australia for 1990, and was No. 1 on the ARIA End of Year album chart. At the 1991 ARIA Awards, Farnham won 'Best Male Artist', 'Song of the Year' for "Burn for You", and 'Highest Selling Album' for Chain Reaction.

Full House to Anthology
Farnham's live album, released in November 1991, was Full House, produced by Ross Fraser and Farnham, which peaked at No. 2 on the ARIA album charts. It contained concert material recorded from May 1987 to October 1990. "Please Don't Ask Me" was released as a single, which peaked into the top 30. At No. 1 on the ARIA album charts was Jimmy Barnes' album, Soul Deep, it included a duet with Farnham, "When Something is Wrong with My Baby", which peaked at No. 3 on the singles charts.

In August 1992, Farnham joined the Australian production of Tim Rice and Andrew Lloyd Webber's stage musical Jesus Christ Superstar in the title role of Jesus. Fellow cast members included Angry Anderson as Herod, Kate Ceberano as Mary Magdalene, Russell Morris as Simon Zealotes, Jon Stevens as Judas and John Waters as Pontius Pilate. The stage soundtrack, Jesus Christ Superstar The Album, provided the single "Everything's Alright" by Ceberano, Farnham and Stevens, which peaked at No. 6 in September. Farnham released his next studio album, Then Again.., in October 1993, produced by Fraser and Farnham, which peaked at No. 1. Of its four singles only, "Seemed Like a Good Idea (At the Time)" reached the top 20. The album won "Highest Selling Album" at the ARIA Awards in 1994.

Farnham never really wanted to try his luck overseas even though he had offers. In a TV Week interview promoting the Romeo's Heart album, he said that people had put pressure on him to live overseas but he had no intention of doing so. "I don't want to go to America to live", he said. He went on to say the pressures for him to relocate "come mainly from other people" but his manager, Glenn Wheatley, has never put this pressure on him.

On Australia Day (26 January) 1996, Farnham was made an Officer of the Order of Australia, "In recognition of service to the Australian music industry and to charitable and community organisations, particularly those relating to youth." His single, "Have a Little Faith (In Us)", in March peaked at No. 3. The associated album, Romeo's Heart, produced by Fraser, was released in June and peaked at No. 2 and won "Best Adult Contemporary Album" at the ARIA Awards in 1996.

Farnham collaborated with vocal group Human Nature to record "Every Time You Cry" which peaked at No. 3 on the singles charts in October 1997. Also in 1997 he released a series of three compilation albums, Anthology 1: Greatest Hits 1986–1997, Anthology 2: Classic Hits 1967–1985 (Recorded Live) and Anthology 3: Rarities which all peaked in the top 20, with Anthology 1 reaching #1.

1998–present
The Main Event with Olivia Newton-John and Anthony Warlow
For The Main Event Tour during October–December 1998, Farnham performed with Olivia Newton-John and Anthony Warlow. The album Highlights from The Main Event peaked at No. 1 in December, sold 4× platinum, and won 'Highest Selling Album' at the 1999 ARIA Awards. The Main Event concert was broadcast on national TV and released on video.

During April–May 1999, Farnham undertook the I Can't Believe He's 50 Tour, supported by Merril Bainbridge, Kate Ceberano, Human Nature, James Reyne, Ross Wilson, and Nana-Zhami containing his son, Robert Farnham. Live at the Regent, recorded on 1 July 1999 (Farnham's 50th birthday), was released in September and peaked at #7.

On 21 December, Farnham performed a set for the Tour of Duty concert in Dili for the Australian troops serving with InterFET and East Timorese people. The concert included James Blundell, Dili Allstars, Gina Jeffreys, The Living End, Kylie Minogue, Doc Neeson and the RMC Band. Tour of Duty was the first of Farnham's concerts to be webcast.

For the 2000 Summer Olympics, Farnham and Newton-John performed "Dare to Dream" during the Parade of Nations at the Opening Ceremony. Broadcast of the ceremony was viewed by an estimated 3.5 billion people around the world. Farnham appeared as himself in the final episode of the Australian television series The Games (2000).

The Last Time to Tom Jones
On 1 January 2001, Farnham was awarded a Centenary Medal, "for outstanding service to Australian music", as part of Australia's celebration of a centenary of federation.

In 2002, Farnham announced his decision to retire from full-scale national tours after his The Last Time Tour—he would still perform in concerts and record—which commenced on 6 November 2002 and finished on 15 June 2003. In conjunction with the tour, The Last Time was released in October 2002, it peaked at No. 1 and achieved 3× platinum sales. "The Last Time Tour" was a countrywide concert tour, taking a circus-style tent to smaller towns and filling large entertainment venues in capital cities, it became the biggest-grossing tour in Australian history.

During July 2003, Farnham worked with Queen to produce a new version of "We Will Rock You" for the 2003 Rugby World Cup, released on his greatest hits album, "One Voice". Media reports of Queen asking Farnham to join the band were subsequently denied by both Queen's Brian May and Farnham. Farnham was inducted into the ARIA Hall of Fame on 21 October with a performance of "You're the Voice". Farnham also won 'Best Adult Contemporary Album' for The Last Time. 2002 Hall of Fame inductee was Olivia Newton-John, while in 2004 Little River Band was inducted.

Combining with singer Tom Jones, Farnham undertook the Together in Concert series during 2004 with ten shows in Perth, Sydney, Brisbane, and Melbourne. Duets started with "That Driving Beat" and "Mama Told Me Not to Come", solos from Farnham were "One", "Pressure Down", "That's Freedom", "Heart's on Fire", "Playing to Win", "Every Time You Cry", "Man of the Hour", "Age of Reason", and "Burn for You". The pair did five duets to close the show—Sam and Dave's "Hold On I'm Coming", Otis Redding's "Try a Little Tenderness", Ray Charles' "What'd I Say", Arthur Conley's "Sweet Soul Music" and AC/DC's anthem, "Long Way to the Top". The DVD release, Together in Concert – John Farnham & Tom Jones, debuted at No 1.

Farnham's career resurrection following The Last Time, has entered the Australian consciousness as a touchstone for others who are seen to return from a strongly-declared retirement. The announcement of the Farnham/Jones Together In Concert tour triggered an unsuccessful claim for damages from a fan, angry that The Last Time tour was not in fact Farnham's last, as purported in its marketing. Consumer watchdog the Australian Competition & Consumer Commission took no action following this complaint.

Farnham made an appearance during the 2005 Melbourne Music Festival, raising funds for rebuilding after the 2004 Indian Ocean earthquake at the Tsunami Benefit Concert.

I Remember When I Was YoungI Remember When I Was Young: Songs from The Great Australian Songbook was released in November 2005—it contains 13 covers of hits, written and performed by Australian artists—which peaked at No. 2 on the ARIA albums charts.

In February 2006, Farnham performed four shows at the Sydney Opera House, with the Sydney Symphony, followed by shows at the Victorian Arts Centre's Hamer Hall, Melbourne. These shows were sponsored by Dairy Farmers and a percentage of revenue received from the 'I Remember When I was Young' concerts went to the Dairy Farmers 'Creating Greener Pastures' program to help farmers and their communities. A 2006 DVD of Farnham entitled John Farnham with the Sydney Symphony Orchestra was released, it debuted at No. 2 on the ARIA DVD charts and then peaked at #1.

From 18 February, Farnham embarked on a small Australian tour with Fleetwood Mac singer Stevie Nicks for a series of live shows. Both artists had equal billing but, unlike the Tom Jones shows, they did not sing together but individually. The same backup singers from the tour, however, were used by both Nicks and Farnham.

On 26 March, Farnham sang at the 2006 Commonwealth Games Closing Ceremony, in Melbourne starting with his hit "Age of Reason", followed by "I Remember When I Was Young" from his most recent studio album, "Playing to Win" from his Little River Band days and finished with his anthem song, "You're the Voice".

The twentieth anniversary of Whispering Jack in 2006 was marked by an "enhanced" commemorative CD re-release plus a DVD featuring an edited version of the tour that accompanied the album (the full concert was originally released on VHS in 1987). The original album was the first CD made in Australia and, as of June 2008, remains the highest-selling album in Australia by an Australian act.

Jack and The Acoustic Chapel Sessions

On 27 May 2009, Farnham announced a new concert tour for September and October, "John Farnham – Live By Demand".

A new studio album, Jack, was released by Sony BMG on 15 October 2010. The album contains 11 tracks and is Farnham's first studio album in over 5 years. Jack features covers of compositions by Ray Charles, Curtis Mayfield and Percy Sledge. The release of Jack coincides with a run of indoor and outdoor performances, under the title of "John Farnham Live!", throughout October and November 2010.

On 8 June 2011, it was announced that Farnham intended to embark on a nationwide tour of Australia throughout October and November 2011 to celebrate the 25th anniversary of the release of the Whispering Jack album. In addition to this, the Whispering Jack Live video album was edited down by 20 minutes and re-released on DVD by Sony BMG.

On 30 September 2011, Farnham released The Acoustic Chapel Sessions live album, recorded in Melbourne in July 2011 at Chapel Off Chapel. The album was released as a CD and DVD 2-disc set by Sony BMG. The CD contains eleven previously released Farnham songs recorded acoustically, while the DVD includes eight songs plus interviews with Farnham and the band as well as additional behind-the-scenes footage.

Olympics, the Seekers and Olivia Newton-John tours
On 27 July 2012, Farnham performed live for the Australian Olympic team in London during the lead up to the 2012 Olympic Games. He performed a number of his best-known songs, including "Playing To Win", "Pressure Down", and "You're The Voice". He appeared in a special one-off show with the Seekers in 2014 as part of the "Decades Festival" commemorating the music, fashion and cars of specific era and coinciding with the Seekers' golden jubilee year.

In 2015, Farnham joined Olivia Newton-John on stage with a concert tour entitled "Two Strong Hearts Live", singing hits from Newton John's film Grease, iconic Farnham numbers and renditions of popular classics such as "Over the Rainbow" and "Tenterfield Saddler". An album was released in June 2015 and debuted at No. 1.

Unauthorised music use
In 2015, Farnham and Wheatley spoke out against the use of his iconic signature song, "You're the Voice", being used by Reclaim Australia, an anti-Islamic group, and again in 2020 in regard to its use at anti-lockdown rallies during the stage 4 COVID-19 pandemic in Melbourne, Victoria which Wheatley described as offensive to Farnham.

Band
, John Farnham's band members are musical director and keyboardist Chong Lim, Angus Burchall on drums, Brett Garsed on guitar, and Craig Newman on bass guitar. Backing vocalists are Lindsay Field, Lisa Edwards, Susie Ahern, and Rod Davies. Previously prominent long-serving members have included Venetta Fields and Stuart Fraser, from the band Noiseworks who regularly performed and toured with the band from 1992 until 2018 when his health deteriorated due to lung cancer. Fraser died on 1 December 2019.

Personal life
Farnham married Jillian Billman, a dancer he met when performing the stage musical Charlie Girl, on 11 April 1973. They have two sons, Robert and James. Farnham is a supporter of the North Melbourne Football Club in the Australian Football League. He lives on a farm near Bendigo.
Health 
After years of performing at high-volume concerts, Farnham has tinnitus and hearing loss, and wears hearing aids. 

In 2019, Farnham cancelled an Australian and New Zealand tour due to a severe kidney infection and dehydration. He subsequently gave up a lifetime habit of smoking, and reduced his alcohol intake.

On 23 August 2022, Farnham released a statement that he was to undergo immediate surgery after being diagnosed with cancer. In this statement, he said "cancer diagnosis is something that so many people face every single day, and countless others have walked this path before me." The same day, he underwent a nearly twelve-hour surgery to remove a tumour in his mouth, including jaw reconstruction. He was transferred to an intensive care unit, in a stable condition. It was later announced that the tumour had been successfully removed.

Charity

Farnham has supported several charities over the years, including headlining the 2019 Hay Mate series of concert for Australia's farming community, which raised over 4.4 million dollars.

Selected discography

 Sadie (1968)
 Everybody Oughta Sing a Song (1968)
 Looking Through a Tear (1970)
 Christmas Is... Johnny Farnham (1970)
 Johnny (1971)Johnny Farnham Sings the Shows (1972)
 Hits Magic & Rock 'N Roll (1973)J.P. Farnham Sings (1975)
 Uncovered (1980)
 Whispering Jack (1986)
 Age of Reason (1988)
 Chain Reaction (1990)Then Again... (1993)
 Romeo's Heart (1996)
 33⅓ (2000)
 The Last Time (2002)
 I Remember When I Was Young: Songs from the Great Australian Songbook (2005)
 Jack (2010)
 The Acoustic Chapel Sessions (2011)

Awards and nominations

Farnham has won and been nominated for numerous Australian music and entertainment awards. These include 21 ARIA Awards from 60 nominations including his induction into their Hall of Fame. Others are Countdown Music and Video Awards, Mo Awards and TV Week'' magazine's King of Pop Awards and their Logie Awards.

In 2015, Farnham, along with AC/DC, Newton John, the Seekers, and Indigenous Australian artist Archie Roach, was inducted into the Music Victoria Hall of Fame.

References

General
 Gazzo, Jane, "John Farnham: The Untold Story", North Sydney, N.S.W. : Penguin Random House Australia, 2 November 2015. .
  Note: Archived [on-line] copy has limited functionality.
 

Specific

External links
 
 
 
John Farnham at the National Film and Sound Archive
John Farnham in AusStage

1949 births
20th-century Australian  male  singers
21st-century Australian  male singers
ARIA Award winners
ARIA Hall of Fame inductees
Australian male singers
Australian male television actors
Australian of the Year Award winners
Australian plumbers
Australian pop singers
Australian soft rock musicians
English emigrants to Australia
Helpmann Award winners
Little River Band members
Living people
Logie Award winners
Naturalised citizens of Australia
Officers of the Order of Australia
People from Dagenham
Recipients of the Centenary Medal
Singers from Melbourne
Sony Music Australia artists